John Kincaide Stadium is a 15,000-seat multi-use stadium in Dallas, Texas owned and operated by the Dallas Independent School District. It opened in 2005. 

Kincaide Stadium is part of the Jesse Owens Memorial Complex and is used for football, soccer, and athletics. It serves as home to Carter and Kimball High Schools.

External links 
 World Stadiums - John Kincaide Stadium
 Texas Bob - Dallas area Stadiums

American football venues in the Dallas–Fort Worth metroplex
Athletics (track and field) venues in Texas
Sports venues in Dallas
High school football venues in Texas
Soccer venues in Texas
2005 establishments in Texas
Sports venues completed in 2005